Patrick Brady Devereux Sr. (November 4, 1926 – August 3, 2003) was an American Thoroughbred racehorse trainer.

He is best known for training Royal Harmony owned by his father Thomas F. Devereux. The gelding won three consecutive editions of the Fayette Handicap at Keeneland Race Course. He is the only trainer in the history of Keeneland to saddle the same horse to victory in the same stakes race, three years running. 

A resident of Lexington, Kentucky, Devereux was still active in racing at the time of his death in 2003. His son Patrick Devereux Jr. also trains thoroughbreds.

References

1926 births
2003 deaths
American horse trainers
Sportspeople from Baltimore
Horse trainers from Lexington, Kentucky